Pseudobombax millei, the beldaco, is a species of flowering plant in the family Malvaceae. It is found only in Ecuador. Its natural habitats are subtropical or tropical dry forests and subtropical or tropical moist lowland forests. It is threatened by habitat loss.

It is a dry-deciduous, tall tree with a spreading of open crown and long-stemmed, broadly oval, hand-shaped, deep green leaves that form a rosette at the branch ends. The upright, white flowers with 5 recurved petals and countless, highly protruding stamens appear at the end of the shoots, followed by cylindrical seed capsules. Flowers are creamy in color and smell great.

Pseudobombax milleii belongs to the protected species!

References

millei
Data deficient plants
Taxonomy articles created by Polbot